Raghupati Raghav Rajaram is an Indian Odia-language drama film directed by Sudhanshu Mohan and produced by Sitaram Agarwal  under Sarthak film banner . The film debuts three new actress: Debasmita Panda, Tapaswi Mishra and Monisha Samantaray. The three actresses were selected from the talent-hunting reality show, 'Mu bi heroine hebi' organised by Sarthak Music. The film was a box office success.

Cast 
 Siddhanta Mahapatra
 Debashish Patra
 Pupindar Singh
 Debasmita Panda
 Tapaswi Mishra
 Monisha Samantray

References 

2010s Odia-language films